Placobdella is a genus of leeches belonging to the family Glossiphoniidae. Species can grow up to 6.5 cm in length, have extremely close eyes and mouths located on the rim or near the anterior (front) sucker.

The genus has almost cosmopolitan distribution.

Species 
Placobdella ali 
Placobdella appalachiensis 
Placobdella bdellae 
Placobdella bistriata 
Placobdella burresonae Siddall & Bowerman, 2006
Placobdella parisitica (Say, 1824)

References

Leeches
Annelid genera